Margaretha "Gret" Loewensberg (born 17 January 1943) is a Swiss architect and the wife of former Swiss Federal Councillor Moritz Leuenberger.

As an architect, Loewensberg has made a name for herself in particular in the field of domestic architecture.

External links 
 Personal Homepage

1943 births
Living people
People from Zürich
Swiss women architects
Spouses of national leaders
20th-century Swiss architects
Place of birth missing (living people)